Madagascar: A Little Wild (also known as A Little Wild) is an American computer-animated streaming television series produced by DreamWorks Animation Television. The series, which is a prequel to the 2005 film, features Alex the Lion, Marty the Zebra, Gloria the Hippo, and Melman the Giraffe residing in a rescue habitat at the Central Park Zoo as children. The series premiered on Hulu and Peacock on September 7, 2020. It concluded with its eighth and final season on June 30, 2022.

Cast 

 Alex (voiced by Tucker Chandler) is a lion cub and is the leader of the Zoosters.  He loves performing for big crowds and is always excited about going on big adventures with his friends.
 Marty (voiced by Amir O'Neil) is a zebra foal and is Alex's best friend.  He's very well-organized and is very strict about safety and following the rules.  He dreams of being a ranger horse someday.
 Melman (voiced by Luke Lowe) is a giraffe calf.  Unlike the rest of his friends, he tends to be in his own little world and tends to get the most enjoyment out of things that other Zoosters may find boring.  He tends to love Kate the most as he appreciates everything she does to take care of him.  He also has a fear of butterflies.
 Gloria (voiced by Shaylin Becton) is a hippopotamus calf and is the only female Zooster.  Like Alex, she loves to perform, which is mostly dancing and swimming.  She is very kind and caring and also serves as the muscle of the Zoosters, though she often gets distracted by other things that interest her.
 Ant'ney (voiced by Eric Petersen) is a street-wise adult pigeon who is friends with the Zoosters.  He delivers any big news to the Zoosters that he hears on the streets of New York City and sometimes helps them out on their adventures.  His favorite activity is finding food laying on the ground and eating it.
 Pickles and Dave (voiced by Candace Kozak) are brother and sister chimpanzees who live in the trees in the same habitat as the Zoosters.  Pickles is a very tomboyish monkey, while her brother, Dave, is deaf and communicates through American Sign Language.  They have a secret lever in their tree that they use to open a secret tunnel allowing the Zoosters to go out into the city, but only after the Zoosters pay them a toll.
 Kate (voiced by Jasmine Gatewood) is the Zookeeper of the New York Zoo.  It's her duty to take care of all the animals at the zoo as best she can.  Alex, Marty, Melman and Gloria are her favorites with Melman being the one who loves her back the most.
 Carlos (voiced by Eric Lopez) is another employee in the zoo who often acts as Kate's second-in-command, but oftentimes, he doesn't know what he's doing.
 Ranger Hoof (voiced by Da'Vine Joy Randolph) is a military horse who often visits the New York Zoo.  Marty idolizes her and dreams of being a ranger horse just like her.
 Lucia (voiced by Myrna Velasco) is a sloth who was introduced in Season 3 of the show.  She's very excitable and loves to teach the Zoosters about things she learned in her homeland, but she also loves to learn new things as well.
 Lala (voiced by Grace Lu) is a tadpole who was introduced in Season 3.  She is very optimistic about having new experiences and ends up becoming Gloria's best friend, but Gloria is a bit obsessed and overprotective with her.
 Murray and Millie (voiced by Charlie Adler and Johanna Stein) are an old married couple who live around the city.  Murray is the only human in New York City who notices the Zoosters whenever they're out on the town, but his wife, Millie, doesn't ever believe him.

Episodes

Series overview

Season 1 (2020)

Halloween Special (2020)

Season 2 (2020)

Season 3 (2021)

Season 4 (2021)

Season 5 (2021)

Christmas Special (2021)

Season 6 (2022)

Season 7 (2022)

Season 8 (2022)

Production 
The series was first announced for Hulu and Peacock on January 17, 2020.

Broadcast 
Outside of the United States, it aired on Family Jr. in Canada on January 9, 2021. The series aired on DreamWorks Channel Asia as part of the DW Jr. block in 2022. The series is available for Latin America, on HBO Max. The series is available for Australia, on Stan.

References

External links 

 
 

2020s American animated television series
2020 American television series debuts
2022 American television series endings
American computer-animated television series
American children's animated adventure television series
American children's animated comedy television series
American children's animated musical television series
American prequel television series
Madagascar (franchise)
Child versions of cartoon characters
English-language television shows
Hulu original programming
Hulu children's programming
Peacock (streaming service) original programming
Peacock (streaming service) children's programming
Animated television series about lions
Animated television series about mammals
Animated television series about children
Animated television shows based on films
Television shows set in New York City
Television series by DreamWorks Animation
Television series by Universal Television
Television shows set in Madagascar